Turan Air was an airline based in Baku, Azerbaijan. As well as operating domestically, the airline offered services to several cities in Russia. Turan Air ceased operations in 2013.

Former Destinations

Baku (Heydar Aliyev International Airport)
Lankaran (Lankaran International Airport)

Yekaterinburg (Koltsovo Airport)
Surgut (Surgut International Airport)
Novosibirsk (Tolmachevo Airport)
Kazan (Kazan International Airport)

Fleet
As of 17 February 2013, in its last year of operation, the Turan Air fleet consisted of five Tupolev Tu-154M aircraft

See also
List of Azerbaijani companies

References

External links
Turan Air
Turan Air Fleet

Defunct airlines of Azerbaijan
Airlines established in 1994
Airlines disestablished in 2013
1994 establishments in Azerbaijan